The 1980 Scheldeprijs was the 67th edition of the Scheldeprijs cycle race and was held on 29 July 1980. The race was won by Ludo Peeters.

General classification

References

1980
1980 in road cycling
1980 in Belgian sport